Ranko Stojić (born 18 January 1959) is a Serbian former professional footballer who played as a goalkeeper. He earned 14 caps for Yugoslavia in the mid 1980s. Following his playing career, Stojić started working as a players' agent.

Club career
Stojić started out at his hometown side Iskra Bugojno in the Yugoslav Second League. He made his senior debuts in the 1976–77 season. In 1978, Stojić moved to Belgrade and joined lower league club Zvezdara. He was transferred to Yugoslav First League side Partizan in the summer of 1980. Over the next four seasons at the Stadion JNA, Stojić made over 100 competitive appearances for the Crno-beli, helping them win the national championship in 1983. He switched to Dinamo Zagreb the following summer, staying with the Modri for the next three years.

In the summer of 1987, Stojić moved abroad and joined Belgian club RFC Liègeois. He played in the country over the following 10 years and also represented Anderlecht, Charleroi (two spells), RFC Sérésien and Royal Antwerp, before retiring from the game.

International career
Stojić made his international debut for Yugoslavia in a friendly away at Scotland on 12 September 1984, under newly appointed manager Miloš Milutinović, as the team was still reeling from the disastrous showing at UEFA Euro 1984 earlier that summer. In addition to Stojić, six other players got their debuts that day in Glasgow; starters Edin Bahtić, Fadilj Vokri, Petar Georgijevski and Zoran Batrović, as well as subs Davor Jozić and Darko Pančev. At halftime, Stojić was brought on for Dragan Pantelić with Yugoslavia trailing 1–3. He conceded three more goals as the match ended in an embarrassing 1–6 loss for Yugoslavia. Still, Stojić left a good enough impression in Scotland to get a start two weeks later for the opening World Cup 1986 qualifier at home versus Bulgaria. The game ended in a goalless draw.

Post-playing career
In 1997, Stojić founded Dynamic Agency, a company for sports management and consulting. Some of his clients included French internationals Louis Saha, Jean-Alain Boumsong, Olivier Kapo, and Djibril Cissé. He was also responsible for the transfers of numerous Serbian footballers abroad, including those of Nenad Tomović, Filip Đorđević and Nemanja Pejčinović, among others.

In addition to his business, Stojić became a main sponsor of Serbian club Rad in the early 2000s. He remained in the role for over a decade, before leaving the position in 2013. Afterwards, Stojić served as sporting director for Slovenian club Olimpija Ljubljana on two occasions, both times under the presidential reign of Milan Mandarić.

Honours
Partizan
 Yugoslav First League: 1982–83
Anderlecht

 European Cup Winners' Cup: 1989-90 (runners-up)

References

External links
 
 
 

Association football goalkeepers
Belgian Pro League players
Challenger Pro League players
Expatriate footballers in Belgium
FK Partizan players
FK Zvezdara players
GNK Dinamo Zagreb players
NK Iskra Bugojno players
People from Bugojno
R. Charleroi S.C. players
RFC Liège players
R.F.C. Seraing (1904) players
Royal Antwerp F.C. players
R.S.C. Anderlecht players
Serbian football chairmen and investors
Serbian sports agents
Serbs of Bosnia and Herzegovina
Yugoslav expatriate footballers
Yugoslav expatriates in Belgium
Yugoslav First League players
Yugoslav footballers
Yugoslavia international footballers
1959 births
Living people